Teter Creek is a stream in the U.S. state of West Virginia. It is a tributary to the Tygart Valley River.

Teter Creek was named in the late 18th century most likely after a member of the pioneer Teter family. Variant names are "Ryans Mill Run", "Teter's Creek", and "Teters Creek".

References

Rivers of West Virginia
Rivers of Barbour County, West Virginia